Netball Queensland is the governing body for netball in Queensland. It is affiliated to Netball Australia. It is responsible for organizing and managing Queensland Firebirds who compete in Suncorp Super Netball. It is also responsible for organizing and managing the HART Sapphire Series as well as numerous other leagues and competitions for junior and youth teams. Its headquarters are based at the Nissan Arena.

History
In 1927, an early incarnation of Netball Queensland, the Australian Ladies Basket Ball Association was a founder member of Netball Australia.

Since 2019, Netball Queensland's headquarters have been based at the Nissan Arena.

Representative teams

Current

Former

Competitions
 HART Sapphire Series
 Ruby Series
 16U and 18U State Titles 
 Senior State Age 
 Junior State Age 
 Vicki Wilson Championship and Boys Open
 Primary Schools Cup

Chief Executive Officers

References

External links
   Netball Queensland on Facebook

 
Queensland
Netball